Mount Disappointment can refer to:
 Mount Disappointment (California) in California, United States
 Mount Disappointment (Australia) in Victoria, Australia
 Disappointment Mountain, or Disappointment Hill, a peak in the Sawtooth Mountains of northeastern Minnesota